Miguel Rubio may refer to:

 Miguel Ángel Rubio (footballer) (born 1961), Spanish footballer
 Miguel Ángel Rubio (gymnast) (born 1966), Spanish gymnast
 Miguel Ángel Rubio Lestán (born 1998), Spanish footballer

See also
 Miguel Ángel Rubiano (born 1984), Colombian road bicycle racer